Orbach is a surname which may refer to:

 Chris Orbach (born 1968), American actor and singer/songwriter
 Elaine Cancilla Orbach (1940–2009), American stage and musical theatre actress and dancer
 Jerry Orbach (1935–2004), American actor
 Maurice Orbach (1902–1979), British politician
 Nir Orbach (born 1970), Israeli politician
 Raymond L. Orbach (born 1934), American physicist and administrator
 Susie Orbach (born 1946), London-based psychotherapist, psychoanalyst, writer and social critic
 Uri Orbach (1960–2015), Israeli politician, journalist and writer
 Wilhelm Orbach (1894–1944), German chess master

See also
 Ohrbach's department store